Graham Dorrington (born in Chalfont St. Giles), is an English aeronautical engineer. He received his PhD from the University of Cambridge in 1989 and was formerly a lecturer at Queen Mary, University of London, though he is now teaching at RMIT University in Melbourne, Australia. He was the subject of the film The White Diamond (2004) directed by Werner Herzog.

External links
 
 BBC Storyville interview with Dorrington

British aerospace engineers
Living people
Year of birth missing (living people)
People from Chalfont St Giles